Mahmoud Mohamed or Mahmoud Mohammed may refer to:

Mahmoud Mohamed Aboud, Comorian ambassador
Mahmoud Mohamed Shaker, Abu Fahr, Egyptian writer, poet journalist and scholar 
Mahmoud Mohammed Taha (1909–1985), also known as Ustaz Mahmoud Mohammed Taha, Sudanese religious thinker, leader

See also
Mohamed Mahmoud (disambiguation)